Black Gold School Division or Black Gold Regional Schools is a public school authority in Central Alberta, Canada, headquartered in Nisku.

Size 
Black Gold School Division (BGSD) is the 7th largest public school division in Alberta with approximately 12,000 students in 32 schools. Formed in 1995, BGSD serves Leduc County, and several municipalities within it, including Beaumont, Calmar, Devon, the city of Leduc, Thorsby, and Warburg.  

The division provides education from pre-kindergarten to grade 12, and offers second language instruction, Career and Technology Studies (CTS) programs, as well as specialized support and disabilities services.

Approximately 720 teachers and 634 support staff are employed by the division.

Governance 
The Board of Trustees of Black Gold School Division is composed of seven trustees, elected as follows, according to Bylaw No. 1-95:  one from the Town of Beaumont, one from the town of Devon, two from the city of Leduc, and three from subdivisions of the remainder of Leduc County.

The Board of Trustees provide overall direction and leadership to the School Division, and is accountable for the provision of appropriate educational services and programs to resident students in keeping with the requirements of government legislation and the values of voters.

French immersion 
Black Gold School Division offers Early French Immersion in its Beaumont and Leduc schools with the objective of providing full mastery of the English language, functional fluency in French, as well as an understanding and appreciation of Francophone culture (including that of the Franco-Albertans). Early immersion means that students begin their immersion experience in Kindergarten or Grade 1 and continue in the program to Grade 12.

See also 
List of school authorities in Alberta

References

External links 
 

School districts in Alberta